Eduard Giray (13 February 1949 – 24 August 2014) was a German wrestler. He competed in the men's freestyle 62 kg at the 1976 Summer Olympics.

References

External links
 

1949 births
2014 deaths
German male sport wrestlers
Olympic wrestlers of West Germany
Wrestlers at the 1976 Summer Olympics
People from Konstanz
Sportspeople from Freiburg (region)